The Czech Republic national baseball team is the national baseball team of the Czech Republic. The team competes in the biennial European Baseball Championship
and debuted in the 2023 World Baseball Classic

Roster

Results and fixtures
The following is a list of professional baseball match results currently active in the latest version of the WBSC World Rankings, as well as any future matches that have been scheduled.

Legend

2019

2020

2021

2022

2023

International tournament results

World Baseball Classic

2009 IBAF World Cup 
In 2009, Europe hosted the IBAF World Cup, the first time in history the Baseball World Cup was not hosted by a specific country. Prague hosted Group A of the pool round, and the Czech Republic team finished 20th, going 0–3 with losses to Australia, Mexico, and Chinese Taipei.

European Baseball Championship
Team Czech Republic competed at the 2019 European Baseball Championship, and came in fifth, behind Team Israel. Among the players who competed for it were Martin Červenka and Marek Minařík.

 1997 : 7th
 1999 : 8th
 2001 : 5th
 2003 : 6th
 2005 : 5th
 2007 : 12th
 2010 : 7th
 2012 : 5th
 2014 : 4th
 2016 : 5th
 2019 : 5th

Olympic Qualifying Tournament
Because Team Czech Republic finished in the top five in the 2019 European Baseball Championship, it moved on to the 2020 Olympics qualifiers in Italy in September 2019. There, it came in third, behind Israel and the Netherlands. Finished 3rd behind the Netherlands and Italy in 2003 for the Athens 2004 games.

References

National baseball teams in Europe
Baseball in the Czech Republic
baseball